Peter Artedi or Petrus Arctaedius (27 February 170528 September 1735) was a Swedish naturalist who is known as the "father of ichthyology".

Artedi was born in Anundsjö in the province of Ångermanland. Intending to become a clergyman, he went after schooling in Harnosand, in 1724, to study theology at Uppsala University, but he turned his attention to medicine and natural history, especially ichthyology, a science that he influenced greatly. In 1728 his countryman Carl Linnaeus arrived in Uppsala, and a lasting friendship was formed between the two from 1729 (as Artedi was away due to the death of his father). In 1732 both left Uppsala, Artedi for England, and Linnaeus for Lappland; before parting they reciprocally bequeathed to each other their manuscripts and books in the event of death.

In 1734 Artedi visited England, mentioning a whale in London in November downstream of the London Bridge, and a meeting with Hans Sloane. Artedi left London in summer 1735 and met Linnaeus in Leiden. Artedi was short of money and Linnaeus introduced him to Albertus Seba, a wealthy Dutchman, who had formed what was perhaps the richest museum of his time in Amsterdam. Seba employed Artedi to write descriptions of fishes for his Thesaurus. On the night of 27 September, while returning from Seba's home to his lodgings, he accidentally fell and drowned in a canal. His body was found the next day. Linnaeus heard of the death through Claudius Sohlberg two days later and rushed to Amsterdam.  According to agreement, his manuscripts came into the hands of Linnaeus, and his Bibliotheca Ichthyologica and Philosophia Ichthyologica, together with a life of the author, were published at Leiden in 1738 under the title Ichthyologia sive opera omnia de piscibus ....

Artedi was buried in a pauper's grave in St Anthony's churchyard in Amsterdam on 2 October 1735. His grave was never marked and the churchyard site has since been appropriated for other purposes. An epitaph, written in Latin by Anders Celsius, and translated into English by George Shaw, is known because it was inscribed on the back flyleaf of Linnaeus's own copy of Ichthyologia:

A memorial stone to Peter Artedi was erected in Amsterdam Zoological Gardens and unveiled on 28 June 1905; it is inscribed in Latin. Other stone memorials are in Anundsjö and Nordmaling in Sweden.

Linnaeus named Artedia (Apiaceae), a monotypic genus from the eastern Mediterranean, after his friend.

References

Further reading
 
 
 Pietsch, Theodore W. (2023). Hur dog Peter Artedi? En vetenskapshistorisk gåta. Translated from the English by Hans Aili. Ekström & Garay, Lund, Sweden ISBN 978-91-89743-41-0.
 
 The Petrus Artedi Tricentennial Symposium on Systematic Ichthyology, 2005

1705 births
1735 deaths
People from Örnsköldsvik Municipality
18th-century Swedish zoologists
Deaths by drowning
Accidental deaths in the Netherlands
18th-century Swedish scientists
Swedish ichthyologists
Uppsala University alumni
Age of Liberty people
Swedish expatriates in the Dutch Republic